Laurace James (born 1937) is an American artist. She was a founding member of A.I.R. Gallery.

References

External links
 A.I.R. Gallery: Laurace James 
 Smithsonian: Laurace James

American women artists
1937 births
Living people
21st-century American women
Date of birth missing (living people)